Levan Arveladze (born 6 April 1993) is a Georgian footballer who plays as a defender plays for Andijon.

Career
Arveladze is a product of the FC Dnipro and FC Kryvbas youth sportive schools. He spent his career in clubs from various league, yet since 2014 plays in Severia region for FC Ahrobiznes TSK Romny, FC Naftovyk-Ukrnafta Okhtyrka.

Desna Chernihiv 
In 2016, he moved to Desna Chernihiv, the main club in Chernihiv, here he won the award of the round 28 in Ukrainian First League in the season 2016–17.

Zorya Luhansk 
On 2 February 2018, he signed pre-contract agreement with Ukrainian Premier League club Zorya Luhansk transferring to the Luhansk club on 1 July 2018, getting into the semifinal of the Ukrainian Cup.

Desna Chernihiv 
In 2020 he signed again for Desna Chernihiv. With the club got into the Quarterfinals of the 2019-20 Ukrainian Cup. He helped Desna Chernihiv qualify for the first time in the history of the club for the 2020–21 Europa League third qualifying round. He left the club in April 2022.

Torpedo Kutaisi
On 7 April 2022, he moved to Torpedo Kutaisi in Erovnuli Liga. On 10 April, he made his debut against Gagra replacing Mate Tsintsadze.

Andijon
In February 2023 he moved to Andijon in Uzbekistan Super League with a contract of two years.

Outside of professional football
In March 2022, during the Siege of Chernihiv, Arveladze, together with other former Desna players, raised money for the civilian population of the city.

Honours
Torpedo Kutaisi
 Georgian Cup: 2022

Desna Chernihiv
 Ukrainian First League: 2017–18

Ahrobiznes TSK Romny
 Sumy Oblast Championship: 2014

Individual
 Best Player round 28 Ukrainian First League: 2016–17

Career statistics

Club

References

External links
Profile on Official FC Desna Chernihiv website

1993 births
Living people
Footballers from Tbilisi
Footballers from Georgia (country)
Georgian emigrants to Ukraine
Naturalized citizens of Ukraine
Ukrainian footballers
Ukrainian expatriate footballers
Association football midfielders
FC Skala Stryi (2004) players
FC Naftovyk-Ukrnafta Okhtyrka players
FC Desna Chernihiv players
FC Zorya Luhansk players
FC Torpedo Kutaisi players
FK Andijon players
Ukrainian Premier League players
Ukrainian First League players
Ukrainian Second League players
Erovnuli Liga players
Uzbekistan Super League players
Expatriate footballers in Georgia (country)
Ukrainian expatriate sportspeople in Georgia (country)
Expatriate footballers in Uzbekistan
Ukrainian expatriate sportspeople in Uzbekistan